Churovskoye is a rural locality (a selo) and the administrative center of Churovskoye Rural Settlement, Sheksninsky District, Vologda Oblast, Russia. The population was 625 as of 2002.

Geography 
Churovskoye is located 44 km northeast of Sheksna (the district's administrative centre) by road. Uloshkovo is the nearest rural locality.

References 

Rural localities in Sheksninsky District